This is a list of electoral results for the electoral district of Victoria Park in Western Australian state elections.

Members for Victoria Park

Election results

Elections in the 2020s

Elections in the 2010s

Elections in the 2000s

Elections in the 1990s

Elections in the 1980s

 Preferences were not distributed.

Elections in the 1970s

Elections in the 1960s 

 Preferences were not distributed.

Elections in the 1950s 

 Two party preferred vote was estimated.

Elections in the 1940s 

 Victoria Park was won by the Independent member William Read at the 1945 by-election upon the death of the sitting Labor member Howard Stirling.

Elections in the 1930s 

 Preferences were not distributed.

References

Western Australian state electoral results by district